Protein-L-isoaspartate(D-aspartate) O-methyltransferase is an enzyme that in humans is encoded by the PCMT1 gene.

Three classes of protein carboxyl methyltransferases, distinguished by their methyl-acceptor substrate specificity, have been found in prokaryotic and eukaryotic cells. The type II enzyme catalyzes the transfer of a methyl group from S-adenosyl-L-methionine to the free carboxyl groups of D-aspartyl and L-isoaspartyl residues. These methyl-accepting residues result from the spontaneous deamidation, isomerization, and racemization of normal L-aspartyl and L-asparaginyl residues and represent sites of covalent damage to aging proteins PCMT1 (EC 2.1.1.77) is a protein repair enzyme that initiates the conversion of abnormal D-aspartyl and L-isoaspartyl residues to the normal L-aspartyl form.[supplied by OMIM]

References

Further reading